Mamadou Diallo is a Mauritanian freestyle wrestler.

Diallo competed for Mauritania at the 1984 Summer Olympics held in Los Angeles, he entered the 90 kg freestyle but lost both of his opening fights and so did not advance to the next round.

References

External links
 

Living people
Olympic wrestlers of Mauritania
Wrestlers at the 1984 Summer Olympics
Mauritanian male sport wrestlers
Year of birth missing (living people)